The Rural Municipality of Lake of the Rivers No. 72 is a rural municipality (RM) in the Canadian province of Saskatchewan within Census Division No. 3 and  Division No. 2. It is located in the southwest portion of the province.

History 
The RM of Lake Of The Rivers No. 72 incorporated as a rural municipality on December 11, 1911.

Geography

Communities and localities 
The following urban municipalities are surrounded by the RM.

Towns
Assiniboia

The following unincorporated communities are within the RM.

Localities
Davyroyd
Willows, dissolved as a village, January 1, 1950

Demographics 

Government 
The RM of Lake of the Rivers No. 72 is governed by an elected municipal council and an appointed administrator that meets on the second Friday of every month. The reeve of the RM is Norm Nordgulen while its administrator is Shanese Mielke. The RM's office is located in Assiniboia.

Transportation 
The Assiniboia Airport is located in the rural municipality.

References 

Lake of the Rivers

Division No. 3, Saskatchewan